This is a survey of the postage stamps and postal history of Haiti.

Haiti is a Caribbean country which occupies the western part of the island of Hispaniola, which it shares with the Dominican Republic.

First stamps
The first stamp of Haiti was issued in 1881 in the 1c value. It showed the head of Liberty.

See also
Postage stamps and postal history of the Dominican Republic

References

Further reading 
 Färnström, Nils Erik Olov. Haiti 1881-1906. Stockholm: Sveriges Filatelist-förbund, 1967 44p.
 Jean-Louis, Harry Germain. Retrospection sur la Poste Haitienne (1er juillet 1881 - 1er juillet 1981). Port-au-Prince: H.G. Jean-Louis, 1981 63p.
 Jeannopoulos, Peter C. Haiti's 1902 Provisional Issue. n.l.: Haiti Philatelic Society, 2008 118p. Series Title: Special study; no. 1.
 Jeannopoulos, Peter C. Early Air Mail of Haiti. n.l.: Haiti Philatelic Society, 2010 28p. Series Title: Special study; no. 2.
 Jeannopoulos, Peter C. Haiti's 50c Nord Alexis Stamp of 1904. n.l.: Haiti Philatelic Society, 2016 72p. Series Title: Special study; no. 4.
 Jeannopoulos, Peter C. Overprint Errors of Haiti, 1939-2000. n.l.: Haiti Philatelic Society, 2017 100p. Series Title: Special study; no. 5.
 Kunze, Alfred F. Who's who on the postage stamps of Haiti. Washington, D.C.: Pan American Union, 1949 19p.
 Levine, Barbara A. Haiti's First Flights. n.l.: Haiti Philatelic Society, 2015 45p. Series Title: Special study; no. 3.
Melville, F.J. The Postage Stamps of Hayti. London: Charles Nissen & Co., c.1904.
 Montes, Leon. La Timbrologie Haïtienne, 1881-1954. Port-au-Prince: Editions Henri Deschamps, 1954 205p.

External links
Haiti postage stamp gallery.
The Haiti Philatelic Society.

Communications in Haiti
Philately of Haiti